The Yamam (an acronym for Centralized Special Unit , Yeḥida Merkazit Meyuḥedet), also called in Hebrew  and Israel's National Counter Terror Unit (I.N.C.T.U.) in English, is Israel's national counter-terrorism unit, one of four special units of the Israel Border Police. The Yamam is capable of both hostage-rescue operations and offensive take-over raids against terrorist targets in civilian areas. Besides military and counter-terrorism duties, it also performs SWAT duties and undercover police work.

History

The Yamam was established in late 1974 after the Ma'alot massacre, where a failed rescue operation by special forces units resulted in the murder of 21 schoolchildren before the hostage takers were killed. Since hostage rescue tactics in friendly territory differ from those used in hostile areas, it was decided to establish an elite civilian force which develops and practices a special CQB (Close Quarters Battles) doctrine for counter-terrorism operations in friendly territory and hostage rescue.

Operational record 1974 – September 2000
Some of the missions known to the public prior to the al-Aqsa Intifada are listed below:

 March 1978, a Yamam force engaged the militants who took over a bus in an event known as the "Coastal Road massacre".
March 1988: Yamam was called into action after a group of three Palestinians hijacked a bus full of women travelling to work at the Negev Nuclear Research Center near Dimona, in an incident known as the "Mothers' Bus attack". The terrorists killed 3 passengers while Yamam returned fire, and in a 40-second takeover killed all three hijackers.
 September 8, 1992: Yamam snipers shot and killed Eitan Mor, a mentally disturbed man who killed 4 women and injured 2 more in a shooting spree at a mental health clinic in Jerusalem.
 May 3, 1994: Yamam snipers shot and killed an armed man in Uzi Meshulam's compound after he shot at a police helicopter.
March 3, 2000: Yamam captured an armed group hidden in the Israeli–Arab town of Tayibe. One man was arrested and four militants were killed by Yamam snipers and an IDF Caterpillar D9 armored bulldozer.

Operational record during the Second Intifada

During the Second Intifada, under the Shin Bet's command, Yamam forces intercepted many militants, either by arresting them or killing them. Several high-profile militants were killed by Yamam operators. Often, when the wanted Palestinian militants were barricaded inside a building, Yamam forces laid siege to it while IDF Caterpillar D9 armored bulldozers forced them out by razing the structure. According to the records, YAMAM killed 179 terrorists during 2000–2005, 50 of them were suicide bombers, and arrested hundreds more.

Operational record after the Second Intifada

 On May 23, 2006, YAMAM force, using intelligence provided by the Shin-Bet, arrested Ibrahim Hamed, the leader of Hamas in Judea and Samaria and an arch-terrorist responsible for many lethal terror attacks, after an IDF Caterpillar D9 armored bulldozer started ramming the house in which he was hiding.
 On September 23, 2014, YAMAM force, together with Israel Defense Forces Combat Engineering Corps bulldozers, killed the two Hamas terrorists who kidnapped and murdered 3 Israeli teenagers in June 2014.
 During the wave of Palestinian terrorism in 2014 and 2015-2016, YAMAM operators killed or arrested high-profile Palestinian terrorists who murdered Israeli civilians.
 YAMAM operators rearrested four out of the six Palestinian prisoners convicted for terrorism that escaped from the Gilboa prison in September 2021.
 On February 8, 2022, YAMAM operators killed 3 Al-Aqsa Martyrs' Brigades militants, responsible for several shooting attacks in January 2022.

Operational record during Operation Breakwater (2022-2023) 

 On April 2, 2022, YAMAM operators killed 3 Palestinian Islamic Jihad terrorists, on their way to commit a terrorist attack. In the firefight, a YAMAM section commander was critically wounded in action, but his life was saved by YAMAM paramedic Noam Raz.
 On August 19, 2022, YAMAM operators killed Ibrahim a-Naboulsi, a commander of the Lions' Den terror cell. The operators launched MATADOR shoulder-fired missile into the apartment he was barricading in Nablus. Two armed terrorists were also killed in that raid. A YAMAM police dog was killed in action.
 On October 25, 2022, the YAMAM lead a combined raid (with the Israel Defense Forces and the Shin Bet) on the Lions' Den headquarter and bomb lab in the heart of Nablus. 5 terrorists, including commanders in the Lions' Den, were killed in the fight and the bomb lab was destroyed. The raid landed a severe blow to the Lions' Den, after which, many of its members surrendered to Palestinian security forces.
 On January 26, 2023, YAMAM lead a combined raid (with the Israel Defense Forces and the Shin Bet) on Jenin refugee camp, which the IDF said was targeted against members of Palestinian Islamic Jihad who were planning an attack. Nine Palestinians were killed in the attack, including an unarmed civilian.

Most of the Unit's activity is classified.

Honors and awards

 In October 2010, the Yamam won the "Urban Shield" SWAT competition held by the Alameda County Sheriff's Office setting a new record in the competition.
 In October 2011, the Yamam won the "Urban Shield" SWAT competition held by the Alameda County Sheriff's Office for the second consecutive year.
In 2011, the Yamam won first place in a shooting competition between snipers from various Israeli special police and commando units.
In October 2013, the Yamam won the international "Urban Shield" counter-terror competition against 27 top rated police and federal SWAT teams from around the world. Their point score was the highest ever in the history of the competition.

The unit received number of honor citations (TZALASH, ציון לשבח) from the Commissioner of the Israeli Police: 2011 2014, 2016, ,2020 and 2022. 

In 2022 the unit received a honor citation from the Israel Defense Forces Chief of the General Staff (צל"ש הרמטכ"ל) for their fighting during Operation Breakwater.

Many YAMAM operators won medals of honor and personal citations. YAMAM sniper Pascal Avrahami received the Israeli Police "Medal of Courage" (עיטור האומץ) and two Medals of Valor (עיטור המופת).

Name and structure
In Israel, the Yamam is also known as the "Special Unit for Counter-Terror Warfare". It is subordinate to the Ministry of Internal Security central command and is part of the civilian Israel Police force, specifically the Israel Border Police. Its operators and officers are professional policemen on payroll, usually with infantry experience from their military service within the Israel Defense Forces (IDF). Yamam recruits its members exclusively from Israeli units.

Responsibilities
The unit is primarily responsible for civilian hostage rescue within Israel's borders, but from around the mid-1990s it has also been used for tasks such as arresting police suspects who have barricaded themselves in structures and requiring specialized extraction methods, as well as in personal security for VIPs and in counter-terror operations within the West Bank and Gaza Strip. The Yamam are schooled in basic Arabic and sometimes dress to assimilate within the Arab population to avoid detection in order to carry out raids to arrest those suspected of conducting terrorist activities within Israel.

The Yamam has a very high volume of activity, conducting hundreds of operations every year, often almost daily. However, most of the Yamam's activity is classified, and published Yamam operations are often credited to other units.

Organization

The Yamam has around 200 officers, and consists of a headquarters element, an intelligence section and a small team responsible for the development of new operational techniques and testing new equipment.

Aside from these central elements, the bulk of the unit is divided into a number of sections, each consisting of five teams, each containing operators with a particular specialization, so that the section includes within its numbers all the elements needed for a successful operation: roping team, entry team, medic team, sniping team, K-9 team, EOD team (demolition and bomb disposal).

Thus, whereas an IDF special forces operation needs to assemble elements from different specialist units, in Yamam, they are all permanently part of the same unit, living, training and operating together.

Recruitment and training

Applicants for Yamam must be between 22 and 30 years old and have completed their three-year infantry service in the IDF with a level 8 of IDF training or higher, although no previous police experience is required. Unlike American SWAT teams, the Yamam is a professional unit with only combat duties and no other type of police work.

The selection process includes a "hell week" that is said to be one of the hardest in the world. This level of difficulty is achieved because all the applicants are already seasoned combat soldiers, many having served in elite special forces units during their compulsory conscription as well. The skills they are looking for in every candidate are: intelligence, physical fitness, motivation, trustworthiness, accountability, maturity, stability, judgment, decisiveness, teamwork, influence, and communication.

Training lasts six months and is carried out in the unit's own training center, although some use is made of the facilities at the IDF Counter Terror Warfare School (LOTAR, Unit 707.) The course is divided into a three-month general CT training period at the end of which recruits are selected for their specialization and then concentrate for the remaining four months on that specialization. Upon graduation, individuals are posted to fill gaps in the sections.

Yamam considers itself to have several advantages over other IDF counter-terror units: firstly because the men are more mature, with most in their mid 30s and early 40s and having spent more time in the unit than equivalent military units, and secondly, because the units contain a far broader range of ages and experience among operatives.

The Yamam is self-dependent, training its own operators in all fields, such as sniping, reconnaissance, rappeling, dog operating, and bomb disposal. As a result, Yamam has a rapid deployment time and high coordination between various squads (e.g. sniping squad, entry team, engagement force).

Equipment

Firearms:
 Pistols
 Glock-17 Pistol
 Glock-19 Pistol
 Glock-26 back-up weapon
 Submachine guns
 Para Micro-Uzi/Uzi-Pro
 B&T APC9 Submachine gun
 FN P90 Submachine gun
 Shotguns
 Remington 870 Combat Shotgun
 Benelli M4 Combat Shotgun
 Assault rifles
 M4A1 carbine (modified by the unit's armorers)
 Colt Commando
 IWI Arad
 Sniper rifles
 SR-25 Mk 11 Semi-automatic Sniper rifle
 PGM Précision Bolt-action Sniper rifles (PGM Ultima Ratio, PGM 338, PGM Hécate II)
 Barrett MRAD Multi-Role Adaptive Design Bolt-Action Sniper rifle
 Barrett M82A1 Anti-materiel rifle
 Grenades and rockets
 M203 grenade launcher
 M72 LAW rocket-propelled grenade
 MATADOR shoulder-fired missile

See also
 Israeli take-over and hostage rescue units:
 Sayeret Matkal
 Shayetet 13 (naval take-over)
 LOTAR Eilat (reserves)
 Metzada Unit (Israeli Prison Service)
 Israeli Special Forces:
 Sayeret
 Israeli security forces:
 Israel Border Police
 Yamas (another Border Police special forces unit)
 Israeli police
 Israeli Defence Forces
 Shin Bet
Similar foreign counter terrorism units:
 List of special response units
 National Security Guard

References

Further reading

 YAMAM  - official site (Israeli Police official website)
 Inside YAMAM - Top Secret Israeli Anti-Terrorism Operation, Vanity Fair, 2018
 Inside the YAMAM - Israel Top Secret Hostage Rescue and Counterterrorist Unit, Esquire, 2018
 Agilite IDF - The Units: Yamam, in Agilite Channel at YouTube, July 2020
 YAMAM - Israel's Counter Terrorism Unit | SWAT | הימ"מ בפעולה, YouTube

1974 establishments in Israel
Police units of Israel
Israeli–Palestinian conflict
Non-military counterterrorist organizations
Special forces of Israel